Duke of Fitz-James (French: duc de Fitz-James) was a title of nobility in the peerage of France. It was created by King Louis XIV of France in 1710 for James FitzJames, 1st Duke of Berwick, an illegitimate son of King James II of England.

This title was used by the junior branch of the House of FitzJames. The title became extinct in 1967 upon the death of Jacques de Fitz-James, 10th Duke of Fitz-James (1886–1967).

List of Dukes of Fitz-James since 1710

References

This page is based on this page on French Wikipedia.

Dukes of France